Rombaut Pauwels or Rombout Pauwels (or Pauli) (1625, in Mechelen – 4 January 1692, in Ghent) was a Flemish architect and sculptor who worked in a moderate Baroque style.  Rombaut Pauwels was active mainly in his hometown Mechelen and in Ghent.

Life
Rombaut Pauwels was a pupil of the sculptors Rombout Verstappen en Jacob Voorspoel in his hometown Mechelen.

He travelled to Rome where he was introduced to the work of his compatriot the Brussels sculptor François Duquesnoy. François Duquesnoy ran a very successful workshop in Rome which produced sculptures in a classicizing Baroque style. Jerôme Duquesnoy (II), the younger brother of François Duquesnoy, and the Antwerp sculptor Artus Quellinus also worked in this workshop in Rome.  They and Rombaut Pauwels brought the moderate Baroque style of François Duquesnoy with them when they returned to the Southern Netherlands.

After his return to Flanders, Rombaut Pauwels was active mainly in his hometown Mechelen and in Ghent.

Rombaut Pauwels’ pupils included the brothers Hendrik and Jan Matthys.

Work
Rombaut Pauwels was a capable sculptor who worked in the classicizing Baroque style pioneered by François Duquesnoy but he lacked the virtuoso technique of his contemporaries Artus Quellinus and Lucas Faydherbe with whom he regularly collaborated.

In Ghent he completed various commissions such as the Baroque gate to the local fish market which was a collaborative effort with Artus Quellinus and J.B. van Helderbergh. In Ghent he was responsible for the tomb of bishop Karel Maes in Ghent Cathedral and the marble statue of a "Madonna with Child" (after a work of Michelangelo) in St Michael's Church. Both works are representative of the rather static and classicizing style of Pauwels.

In Mechelen he collaborated with the leading Baroque sculptor of the city, Lucas Faydherbe, on the tomb of Archbishop Andreas Creusen (1660) and an altar (1660–1665) in St. Rumbold's Cathedral.

A terracotta Virgin with Child and Saint John the Baptist (c.1650, exhibited in Paris in 2013, private collection) is a more dynamic work.

References

External links

Flemish Baroque sculptors
17th-century births
1692 deaths
Artists from Mechelen